Underwater warfare is one of the three operational areas of naval warfare, the others being surface warfare and aerial warfare. It refers to combat conducted underwater such as:
Actions by submarines actions, and anti-submarine warfare, i.e. warfare between submarines, other submarines and surface ships; combat airplanes and helicopters may also be engaged when launching special dive-bombs and torpedo-missiles against submarines;
Underwater special operations, considering:
Military diving sabotage against ships and ports.
Anti-frogman techniques.
Reconnaissance tasks.

Name
Underwater warfare may also be referred to as undersea warfare or subsurface warfare.

History
In the 20th century underwater warfare was dominated by the submarine. In the 21st century unmanned underwater vehicles are coming to play a significant part in underwater warfare.

Seabed warfare

Seabed warfare is defined as “operations to, from and across the ocean floor.” In general the target of seabed warfare is infrastructure in place on the seabed such as power cables, telecom cables, or natural resource extraction systems.

See also

 Commando
 Frogman
 List of military special forces units
 Naval tactics
 Spetsnaz

References

Naval warfare
Warfare